A country code is a short alphanumeric identification code for countries and dependent areas. Its primary use is in data processing and communications. Several identification systems have been developed.

The term country code frequently refers to ISO 3166-1 alpha-2, as wall as the international dialing code, which is embodied in the E.164 recommendation by the International Telecommunication Union (ITU).

ISO 3166-1
The standard ISO 3166-1 defines short identification codes for most countries and dependent areas:
ISO 3166-1 alpha-2: two-letter code
ISO 3166-1 alpha-3: three-letter code
ISO 3166-1 numeric: three-digit code

The two-letter codes are used as the basis for other codes and applications, for example,
for ISO 4217 currency codes
with deviations, for country code top-level domain names (ccTLDs) on the Internet: list of Internet TLDs.
Other applications are defined in ISO 3166-1 alpha-2.

ITU country calling codes
In telecommunication, a country code, also called country dialing code and international subscriber dialing (ISD) code, is a telephone number prefix used in international direct dialing (IDD) and for destination routing of telephone calls to a country other than the caller's. A country or region with an autonomous telephone administration must apply for membership in the International Telecommunication Union (ITU) to participate in the international public switched telephone network (PSTN). County codes are defined by the ITU-T section of the ITU in standards E.123 and E.164.

Country codes are a component of the international telephone numbering plan and are dialed only when calling a telephone number in another country. They are dialed before the national telephone number.

The ITU standard specifies that an international telephone number is represented by prefixing it with a plus sign (+), which indicates to a caller that the local international call prefix must be dialed first. These prefixes are different in various countries, but the ITU recommends the prefix 00 for new implementations.

Other country codes
European Union:
Before the 2004 EU enlargement the EU used the UN Road Traffic Conventions license plate codes. Since then, it has used the ISO 3166-1 alpha-2 code, but with two modifications:
EL for Greece (instead of GR)
(formerly) UK for United Kingdom (instead of GB)
The Nomenclature des unités territoriales statistiques (Nomenclature of territorial units for statistics, NUTS) of the European Union, mostly focusing on subdivisions of the EU member states
FIFA (Fédération Internationale de Football Association) assigns a three-letter code (dubbed FIFA Trigramme) to each of its member and non-member countries: List of FIFA country codes
Federal Information Processing Standard (FIPS) 10-4 defined two-letter codes used by the U.S. government and in the CIA World Factbook: list of FIPS country codes. On September 2, 2008, FIPS 10-4 was one of ten standards withdrawn by NIST as a Federal Information Processing Standard.
 The Bureau of Transportation Statistics, part of the United States Department of Transportation (US DOT), maintains its own list of codes, so-called World Area Codes (WAC), for state and country codes.
 GOST 7.67: country codes in Cyrillic from the GOST standards committee
From the International Civil Aviation Organization (ICAO):
The national prefixes used in aircraft registration numbers
Location prefixes in four-character ICAO airport codes
International Olympic Committee (IOC) three-letter codes used in sporting events: list of IOC country codes
From the International Telecommunication Union (ITU):
the E.212 mobile country codes (MCC), for mobile/wireless phone addresses,
the first few characters of call signs of radio stations (maritime, aeronautical, amateur radio, broadcasting, and so on) define the country: the ITU prefix,
ITU letter codes for member-countries,
ITU prefix - amateur and experimental stations - The International Telecommunication Union (ITU) assigns national telecommunication prefixes for amateur and experimental radio use, so that operators can be identified by their country of origin. These prefixes are legally administered by the national entity to which prefix ranges are assigned.
Three-digit codes used to identify countries in maritime mobile radio transmissions, known as maritime identification digits
License plates for automobiles:
Under the 1949 and 1968 United Nations Road Traffic Conventions (distinguishing signs of vehicles in international traffic): List of international license plate codes.
Diplomatic license plates in the United States, assigned by the U.S. State Department.
North Atlantic Treaty Organization (NATO) used two-letter codes of its own: list of NATO country codes. They were largely borrowed from the FIPS 10-4 codes mentioned below. In 2003 the eighth edition of the Standardisation Agreement (STANAG) adopted the ISO 3166 three-letter codes with one exception (the code for Macedonia). With the ninth edition, NATO is transitioning to four- and six-letter codes based on ISO 3166 with a few exceptions and additions
United Nations Development Programme (UNDP) also has its own list of trigram country codes
 World Intellectual Property Organization (WIPO): WIPO ST.3 gives two-letter codes to countries and regional intellectual property organizations
World Meteorological Organization (WMO) maintains a list of country codes, used in reporting meteorological observations
 UIC (the International Union of Railways): UIC Country Codes

The developers of ISO 3166 intended that in time it would replace other coding systems.

Other codings
Country identities may be encoded in the following coding systems:
The initial digits of International Standard Book Numbers (ISBN) are group identifiers for countries, areas, or language regions.
The first three digits of GS1 Company Prefixes used to identify products, for example, in barcodes, designate (national) numbering agencies.

Lists of country codes by country
A -
B -
C -
D–E -
F -
G -
H–I -
J–K -
L -
M -
N -
O–Q -
R -
S -
T -
U–Z

See also
List of country calling codes (International telephone dialing codes)
List of ISO 3166 country codes
ISO 639 language codes
Language code
Numbering scheme

References

External links
Comparison of various systems
Another comparison: 
A comparison with ISO, IFS and others with notes
United Nations Region Codes

Geocodes